This is a list of grand masters of the Constantinian Order of Saint George, a dynastic order of knighthood of the Catholic Church. Although it was founded by Albanian nobles claiming descent from the Byzantine Angelos dynasty in the 16th century, the order has throughout its existence maintained that it has its origin in Ancient Roman times, supposedly founded by Constantine the Great in the 4th century. Such an origin is otherwise regarded as being impossible, as there are no Roman or Byzantine records of such an institution ever existing and chivalric orders being completely unknown in the Byzantine world.

The founders of the order, the Angeli family, provided forged genealogies tracing their descent back to the 4th century, with grand masters covering the period from the Constantinian dynasty to the 16th century. These grand masters, maintained in modern official lists of grand masters, are mostly entirely invented, though some were real historical figures albeit with no connection to the chivalric order. In 1698, the position of grand master passed to the House of Farnese, and in 1732 it passed to the House of Bourbon-Two Sicilies, once rulers of the Kingdom of the Two Sicilies, to which the office still belongs. The line of grand masters within the House of Bourbon is divided today, with three separate claimants to the position. The Parmese branch of the Constantinian order split from the legitimate order in 1816 and is still maintained by the House of Bourbon-Parma. The legitimate order has itself been the subject of a succession dispute since 1960, which has in effect produced separate Spanish and Neapolitan orders, though neither recognizes the other as legitimate.

In addition to these succession disputes, claims to be the legitimate grand master of the Constantinian Order have also been forwarded by many impostors and pretenders to Byzantine titles and descent, on account of the order's invented Byzantine origins and its form of hereditary succession. As such, forgers who have claimed to represent "rightful" Byzantine emperors or dynasts have also often claimed the position of grand master. Several such "grand masters" remain active today.

Legendary grand masters (313–1570) 
The founding family of the Constantinian Order, the Angeli, made great genealogies that traced their descent back to the 4th century, as supposed descendants of Constantine the Great, with grand masters covering this period up until the 16th century. These grand masters are maintained in modern official lists of grand masters, but they are almost entirely invented figures. A handful of individuals are genuine historical figures, but they have no connection to the later chivalric order.

Historical grand masters (1545–present)

House of Angeli (1545–1623)

House of Caracciolo (1623–1627)

House of Angeli (1627–1698)

House of Farnese (1698–1731)

House of Bourbon-Two Sicilies (1732–present)

Disputed succession (1960–present) 
The leadership of the Constantinian Order has been disputed since the death of Ferdinand Pius in 1960. The immediate male primogeniture heir of Ferdinand Pius was Infante Alfonso, the son of Pius' eldest younger brother Carlos. Carlos married María de las Mercedes, Princess of Asturias, the heir presumptive of Spain, in 1901. As a result of the marriage, the Spanish government forced Carlos to renounce his "eventual succession to the crown" of the Two Sicilies, in line with the centuries-old agreement that the crowns of Spain and Two Sicilies were not to unify. Although this renunciation was interpreted by many as removing Carlos and his descendants from the line of succession of the Two Sicilies, supporters of Alfonso argued that the renouciation would only have applied if Carlos' wife or an eventual son had actually become the sovereign of Spain, which did not happen. Nevertheless, Ferdinand Pius' and Carlos' younger brother, Ranieri, began to regard himself as Pius' heir.

In Naples, the base of operations of the order, there was significant opposition towards the idea of Alfonso succeeding Pius as it was feared that he would introduce Spanish elements into what was otherwise viewed as a distinctly Neapolitan institution. Not only was Ranieri supported by many of the Constantinian Order's members, but Ferdinand Pius also made it clear that he wished Ranieri, and not Alfonso, to succeed him. Many of the order's knights felt obliged to respect Pius' wishes. At the same time as Ranieri was proclaimed grand master in Naples after Pius' death, Alfonso was proclaimed grand master in Madrid; Alfonso had at no point doubted his own rights and had not even been informed by his father that they had been "renounced" given that Carlos himself considered his supposed renunciation irrelevant.

Whereas the claim of Ranieri and his descendants was supported by those in the senior ranks of the Constantinian Order, as well as most royal houses in Europe, the claim of Alfonso and his descendants is supported by the Spanish Royal House. Other supporters of Alfonso's claim included the exiled royals Robert of Parma (also grand master of his branch of the order) and Duarte Nuno de Bragança (head of the former royal house of Portugal). Noteworthy royal supporters of Ranieri's claim included Umberto II (the former king of Italy), Henri of Orléans (claimant to the throne of France), Archduke Gottfried of Austria (titular Grand Duke of Tuscany), Albrecht (titular Duke of Bavaria), Philipp Albrecht (titular Duke of Württemberg), Prince Amadeo (titular Duke of Aosta), Filiberto (titular Duke of Genoa) and Prince Michael of Greece and Denmark, among others. Though the Italian government previously did not recognize the claims of Alfonso's descendants, and forbade the use of titles and honors granted by their order, in favor of recognizing Ranieri's line, since the 1980s, awards granted by both lines of grand masters have had the same legal recognition. The two sides of the family briefly reached the beginning stages of a resolution between 2014 and 2016, briefly recognizing the claimed noble titles of each other, before Prince Carlo (heir to Ranieri's claim) renounced his recognition of Prince Pedro's (the heir to Alfonso's claim) titles.

Claimants and pretenders

Parmese Constantinian order (1816–present) 
After the defeat of Napoleon, the Congress of Vienna accorded his former wife, Marie Louise of the House of Habsburg-Lorraine, the duchies of Parma, Piacenza and Guastalla, and shortly thereafter also Lucca (though she only held Lucca briefly), as the owner of those territories, the Kingdom of Etruria, had been a Napoleonic ally. Before she even reached her new territories, Maria Louise's advisor, companion and lover Adam Albert von Neipperg recognized that she would require the support of the local nobility in Parma in order to rule efficiently, and thus advised Marie Louise to found her own Constantinian Order, envisioned as a re-establishment of the original institution.

Claiming that the grand mastership of the order was tied to the duchies of Parma and Piacenza and descent from the Farnese family, Marie Louise proclaimed herself grand master of the Constantinian Order on 26 February 1816. She was descended from the Farnese family through her grandfather, Ferdinand I of the Two Sicilies, who was still alive and still legitimately claimed the position of grand master himself. Although her claim to the position was immediately met with protest from Ferdinand, Maria Louise had the powerful support of her father, Emperor Francis I of Austria. Though Ferdinand protested to Pope Pius VII, there was little Pius could do other than refusing to recognize Maria Louise, especially in the face of Francis' support of her. Trying to reach a position of agreement, the official position of the court of the Two Sicilies was that Ferdinand's right to the order could not be diminished as it was based on primogeniture, but that Maria Louise was also in her right to found an order in imitation of the Constantinian Order given that she governed Parma; however due to the changes introduced by her, such as introductions of new classes, the order could not be considered a continuation of the ancient order. There was never any formal accord between Parma and Naples, but the two orders continued to maintain a status quo by refusing requests for awards by the other's subjects, and by the Parma order adding the adjectives "Imperial" and "Angelic" to the order's full name.

House of Habsburg-Lorraine (1816–1847)

House of Bourbon-Parma (1848–present)

Other claimants 
 Andrea Angeli (claimant 1634–1644), the youngest son of grand master Girolamo I Angeli. Disputed the succession of Angelo Maria Angeli in 1634 on account of Angelo Maria's father Michele Angeli having been born illegitimate. 
Girolamo II Angeli (claimant 1644–1678/1679), the eldest son of Andrea. Girolamo II continued his father's lack of recognition of Angelo Maria as grand master. Upon the death of Angelo Maria in 1678 (or Marco in 1679), Girolamo II succeeded as the legitimate grand master of the order. 
Ferdinand, Duke of Parma (claimant 1778–1802), a member of the House of Bourbon, Ferdinand claimed the position of grand master in opposition to Ferdinand I of the Two Sicilies on the erroneous argument that the office was tied to the Duchy of Parma (which Ferdinand held), rather than hereditary succession, similar to Marie Louis's later claim.

Forgers 

Because the position of grand master within the Constantinian Order is hereditary, numerous forgers and self-styled princes have either claimed relations to the Angeli family, or claimed entirely alternate lines of imperial descent (so as to produce a superior claim to the position). For the most part, such claimants can easily be dismissed as forgers and opportunists, typically without genuine links to Greek or Albanian families. Many later pretenders have purported to be either part of the order, or its legitimate grand master.
 John George Heracleus Basilicos (claimant  1566–1593), a claimant to Byzantine heritage just like the Angeli family, John George and Andrea Angeli (grand master  1545–1580) recognized each other as Byzantine descendants and relatives out of mutual benefit. In the 1560s, John George proclaimed himself grand master, a claim he maintained until he was imprisoned in 1593 after the papacy favored the claims of grand master Giovanni Andrea I Angeli over his.
 Gian Antonio Lazier (claimant  1720–1738), forged relations with the Angeli family and the Palaiologos dynasty of Byzantine emperors and thus challenged Francesco Farnese's assumption of the position of grand master, arguing that his line of Byzantine descent was superior to that of Farnese and that the sale of the position was of questionable legality. Seen by some contemporaries as having an equally valid claim to the position as Farnese, Lazier was officially supported by Charles VI, Holy Roman Emperor, until around the time his forgeries were exposed by Farnese in 1725.
 Radu Cantacuzino (claimant  1735–1761), descendant of the Byzantine Kantakouzenos family and son of Ștefan Cantacuzino, Prince of Wallachia (1714–1716). Inventing a line of descent directly from Emperor John VI Kantakouzenos, Cantacuzino claimed the grand mastership as a rival to both Francesco Farnese and Gian Antonio Lazier, perhaps with recognition from Charles VI, Holy Roman Emperor.
 Ioannis Rhodocanakis (claimant  1860–1895), father of Demetrius Rhodocanakis, proclaimed as the legitimate grand master in the writings of his son.
 Demetrius Rhodocanakis (claimant 1895–1902), forged descent from the Palaiologos dynasty of Byzantine emperors, claiming female-line descent from Theodore Paleologus (–1636). Claimed the position of grand master and the title of emperor after his father's death in 1895. In 1871, Rhodocanakis' claims were recognized by the papacy after an audience with Pope Pius IX. His claims had been thoroughly exposed and debunked by the early 20th century.
 Eugenio Lascorz (claimant  1906–1962), forged descent from the Laskaris dynasty of Byzantine emperors, claiming the position of titular emperor as well as claiming to be the rightful grand master of the Constantinian Order, as well as of a self-styled order, the "Order of Saint Eugene of Trebizond".
 Paul Crivez (claimant 1945–1984), claimed to be the rightful senior heir of the Palaiologos dynasty through adoption by Alexandrine Paléologue (born Boutcoulesco), the widow of a man named Grégoire Paléologue. Crivez forged a genealogy that made Grégoire out to be a descendant of Manuel Palaiologos.
 Marziano Lavarello (claimant  1948–1992), forged descent from the Laskaris and Palaiologos dynasties, claiming to be the rightful emperor as well as the rightful grand master of the Constantinian Order. Lavarello's claims were recognized by a court in Rome in 1948.
 Peter Mills (claimant 1960s–1988), forged descent from the Palaiologos dynasty, through Manuel Palaiologos, claiming to be the rightful emperor as well as the rightful grand master of the Constantinian Order.
 Enrico de Vigo Paleologo (claimant 1961–2010), forged connections to the Laskaris and Palaiologos dynasty, and even as far back as Emperor Nero (54–68). Claimed to be the rightful emperor and grand master of both the Constantinian Order and his own "Order of the Cross of Constantinople".
 Teodoro Láscaris (claimant 1962–2006), son and heir of Eugenio Lascorz.
 Pietro Paleologo Mastrogiovanni (claimant 1966–2017), forged descent from Thomas Palaiologos, claimed to be the rightful emperor and grand master.
 Patricia Palaeologina (claimant 1988–present), widow of Peter Mills and continuator of his claims, his children by his first wife having renounced his pretensions as a "utter sham".
 Arcadia Luigi Maria Picco (claimant 1992–present), questionably claims to have been willed the claims and titles of Marziano Lavarello, presenting himself as Lavarello's successor as titular emperor and grand master of the Constantinian Order.
 Eugenio Láscaris (claimant 2006–present), son and heir of Teodoro Láscaris.
 Françoise Paleologo (claimant 2010–present), widow and designated heir to the position of grand master of Enrico Constantino de Vigo Aleramico Lascaris Paleologo.
 Giovanni Angelo Paleologo Mastrogiovanni (claimant 2017–present), son and heir of Pietro Paleologo Mastriogiovanni.

See also 
Succession to the Byzantine Empire

References

Bibliography

Web sources 

 

 
 

Lists of Grand Masters
Lists of Roman Catholics